Arthur Graeme Slaght (3 May 1877 – 21 January 1964) was a Canadian lawyer and politician. Slaght served as a Liberal party member of the House of Commons of Canada. He was born in Simcoe, Ontario.

Slaght attended secondary school at Simcoe, then studied at Osgoode Hall Law School.

He unsuccessfully attempted to win a seat in the House of Commons at Timiskaming riding in a by-election on 7 April 1920. He won the Parry Sound seat in the 1935 federal election and was re-elected there in 1940. After completing his term in the 19th Canadian Parliament, Slaght did not seek a further term in the 1945 election.

References

External links
 

1877 births
1964 deaths
Lawyers in Ontario
Liberal Party of Canada MPs
Members of the House of Commons of Canada from Ontario
People from Norfolk County, Ontario